Monsildale is a rural locality in the Somerset Region, Queensland, Australia.

History
The name Monsildale comes from the name of pastoral run used by David Cannon McConnel (1818-1885), which was named after the Derbyshire valley which contained Cressbrook, his home town.

Monsildale Provisional School opened on 2 June 1913. In 1923, the school was relocated and renamed Foxlowe Provisional School. Then on 25 June 1926 it was renamed Jimna Provisional School and on 1 October 1934 became Jimna State School. It was mothballed in 2006 and officially closed on 31 December 2009.

Louisavale Provisional School opened on 11 November 1915. It closed on  closed on 1 Feb 1934 due to low student numbers, but reopened on 25 July 1934. It closed permanently on 9 September 1940.

In about 1941, a separate Monsildale State School was opened but closed about 1961.

Heritage listings
Monsildale has a number of heritage-listed sites, including:
 2532 Monsildale Road: Monsildale Homestead

References

Suburbs of Somerset Region
Localities in Queensland